The 2021 Algeria wildfires are multiple wildfires happening in Algeria since 9 August 2021, and have killed 90 people, including 57 civilians and 33 soldiers. The soldiers died after being trapped in the blaze during rescue operations.

On 9 August, many fires started up in the Kabylia region and elsewhere, and Algerian authorities sent soldiers to help citizens with the blazes and evacuations.

On 10 August, multiple fires have burned Mediterranean trees, destroying olive trees and killing cattle and chickens.
Many distant villages have very limited water. Some villagers fled, while others tried to hold back the flames themselves, using buckets, branches and rudimentary tools, due to the unavailability of firefighting aircraft.

On 12 August, president Abdelmadjid Tebboune said in a live speech on state television that "criminal hands were behind most" of the fires and that 22 people have been arrested.

After 7 days following the appearance of the wildfires, Civil Protection units have successfully extinguished 41 forest fires in nine provinces in the past 24 hours, and complete extinction of fires in Annaba was reported.

On 17 August, all forest fires in Jijel and Sétif were extinguished.

On 18 August, president's office said that "ultimate responsibility" for fires lay with the Islamist Rachad group and MAK, an ethnopolitical autonomy organization that aims to split the ethnic Berber region of Kabyle from the rest of Algeria, with "support and help from foreign parties, particularly Morocco and the Zionist entity", referring to Israel.

The 2021 Algerian-Israeli naval incident took place during these wildfires on 27 September.

Casualties 
A total of 610 km of electricity network and no less than 710 stations were destroyed by the fires that ravaged several municipalities in Tizi Ouzou Province, according to a report released during an inspection visit of the CEO of the Sonelgaz group, Chaher Boulkhras. Some 5,193 hectares of fruit trees and 19,178 farm animals burned in the fires, according to a nondefinitive report from the Local Direction of Agricultural Services (DSA) and a total of 1,705 homes burned were appraised by engineers from the Technical Construction Control body (CTC).

According to a report made public in May 2022 by the Algerian Directorate General of Forests (DGF), the total area of vegetation cover affected by fires during the summer of 2021, amounts to more than 100,000 hectares through 1,631 fire outbreaks recorded in 21 wilayas. A total of 260,135 hectares of forests (26% of the total area), 21,040 hectares of bushes (21.5%), 16,415 hectares of scrub (16.5%), 16,160 hectares of fruit trees (36%) and 352 hectares of esparto (0.5%) were ravaged by the fires.

Killing of Djamel Bensmail 
Djamel Bensmail, an artist and social activist from Miliana, was reported by the local media to be brutally killed days after the fires in Tizi Ouzou appeared, by a group of people that set him on fire. He was initially charged, baselessly, with incendiarism.

Later, a video showing the assault against Djamel Bensmail went viral online, showing his final minutes as he was burned alive and killed for his alleged role. However, social media users identified him as a prominent artist who was present in the area to help residents put out the fires.

In the video, Bensmail was pleading with the mob and repetitively insisting that he had no role in the wildfires that were spreading. Furthermore, several members of the group were shouting racist and insulting slang at the victim, such as sale arabe, which is French for dirty Arab. It is believed that several members of this mob appearing in the footage are affiliated with the MAK. The MAK is also accused by Algerian authorities as having separatist aims and an anti-Arab sentiment. Due to this, it is strongly believed that Bensmail was in fact guiltless.

The Director of the Judicial Police at the General Directorate of National Security (DGSN), Mohamed Chakour, affirmed the arrest of 36 defendants including 3 women, involved in the assassination and lynching of Bensmail in Larbaâ Nath Irathen in Tizi Ouzou. On 17 August, The DGSN released a new video including the confessions of new suspects arrested in connection with the case.

References

See also 

 2022 Moroccan wildfires

2021 meteorology
Wildfires
2021 wildfires
2021 fires in Africa
Arson in Africa
Arson in the 2020s
August 2021 events in Africa
Crime in Algeria
Wildfires in Algeria
2021 disasters in Algeria